The Russian route R254 is a federal highway in Russia and Kazakhstan and is part of the Baikal Highway (which is part of the Trans-Siberian Highway).

The Chelyabinsk-Omsk stretch is also included into the European route E30.

Before 2018, the route was known as the M51.

Major Cities 
 Chelyabinsk
 Petropavl
 Omsk
 Novosibirsk

Gallery

References

Transport in Siberia
Roads in Siberia
Constituent roads of European route E30